Arthur Reed may refer to:
 Arthur Reed (footballer, born 1894) (1894–?), English footballer
 Arthur Reed, namesake of the Cromer Lifeboat Ruby and Arthur Reed II ON 1097
 Arthur Reed (politician) (1881–1961), British Member of Parliament for Exeter, 1931–1945
 Arthur Reed (1860–1984), American longevity claimant, died aged 123 years, 292 days; see longevity claims
 Arthur Reed (RAF officer) (1898–?), World War I flying ace
 Arthur Reed (Australian footballer) (1883–1951), Australian rules footballer
 Arthur Reed (cinematographer) for The Corpse Vanishes

See also
Arthur Reid (disambiguation)
Arthur Read (disambiguation)